Turner's eremomela (Eremomela turneri) is a species of bird formerly placed in the "Old World warbler" assemblage, but now placed in the family Cisticolidae.

It is found in Democratic Republic of the Congo, Kenya and Uganda.
Its natural habitats are subtropical or tropical moist lowland forests and subtropical or tropical moist montane forests.
It is threatened by habitat loss.

References

External links
BirdLife Species Factsheet.

Turner's eremomela
Birds of Central Africa
Birds of East Africa
Turner's eremomela
Taxonomy articles created by Polbot